Negrilești is a commune in Galați County, Western Moldavia, Romania that lies close to Tecuci. It is composed of two villages, Negrilești and Slobozia Blăneasa. These were part of Munteni Commune until 2004, when they were split off.

References

Communes in Galați County
Localities in Western Moldavia